Houle Island is a low rocky island  west of Ressac Island and about  north-northeast of Zelee Glacier Tongue, Antarctica. It was photographed from the air by U.S. Navy Operation Highjump, 1946–47, was charted by the French Antarctic Expedition, 1949–51, and so named by them because the surf breaks over this low-lying island. "Houle" is a French word for surge or swell.

See also 
 List of Antarctic and sub-Antarctic islands

References

Islands of Adélie Land